Sunstone is a magazine published by the Sunstone Education Foundation, Inc., a 501(c)(3) nonprofit corporation, that discusses Mormonism through scholarship, art, short fiction, and poetry. The foundation began the publication in 1974 and considers it a vehicle for free and frank exchange in the Church of Jesus Christ of Latter-day Saints (LDS Church). The magazine's motto is Faith Seeking Understanding.

History
In the 1960s–1970s, independent Mormon studies associations and publications were emerging, including the Mormon History Association and Dialogue: A Journal of Mormon Thought.  The Journal of Mormon History and Exponent II were both launched in 1974, and in that same year two graduate students at divinity schools, Scott Kenney and Keith Norman, hatched plans to create a scholarly journal for Mormon students.  Gathering student volunteers but lacking funding, the team produced and sold a Mormon history calendar in Utah and California.  They were encouraged by the Dialogue staff, including editor Robert Rees, who suggested the name "Sunstone," an architectural symbol from the Mormon temple in Nauvoo.  After struggles and delays, the first issue was printed in November 1975.

The publication faced early challenges.  The time and effort to produce each issue was demanding on the volunteer staff, and the first several issues had a different editor for each issue, under the leadership of Kenney and Peggy Fletcher.  For Orson Scott Card's ghost-edited issue in Summer 1977, Card had convinced the board to change to a cheaper and more accessible magazine format.  Facing financial troubles later that year, Sunstone merged with the New Messenger and Advocate, a new LDS news magazine with plenty of advertising, which further influenced the Sunstone format.  In 1978 Kenney returned to edit three more issues before retiring from the venture, and passing the editorship to Fletcher and Allen D. Roberts who would also go on to start its symposia.  The magazine kept its approach for a popular audience while emphasizing intellectual issues, but it eventually dropped its student emphasis.

Symposia

In 1979, Sunstone began sponsoring an annual symposium in Salt Lake City, which is now a four-day event with approximately 100 different sessions generally held the second week of August. Since the 1980s, Sunstone has also regularly held regional symposia in Washington, D.C., California, Seattle, Chicago, Dallas, and Boston.

While early magazine issues and symposia included heavy participation from a full range of perspectives, circumstances and events in the late 1980s and early 1990s damaged Sunstone's reputation and hurt subscribership. These events included a 1989 address given by Dallin H. Oaks, an apostle of the LDS Church, warning of "Alternate Voices" and a November 1991 "Statement on Symposia" issued by the church's First Presidency, although Sunstone was never mentioned in either case. Because of Sunstone'''s position as a visible symbol of independent thought within Mormonism, however, these communications led to a decline in participation in Sunstone fora by many conservative and moderate voices. This trend culminated after six individuals were disciplined by the LDS Church in September 1993, after which the potential costs of writing for the magazine and speaking at its symposia were feared by some to be too high. With a lack of participation from moderate and conservative voices, Sunstone experienced an unbalancing of many presentations toward liberal causes and points of view.Moore, Carrie A. "2 meets to focus on LDS thought," Deseret News, August 3, 2002.

With the passage of time and under new leadership, the Sunstone Education Foundation has begun to recover much of its former status as a vehicle for frank, honest discussion in Mormonism, with increased balance and a concerted effort to be welcoming to all voices.Mims, Bob. "Sunstone's future at a crossroads," Salt Lake Tribune, June 17, 2001.

The Smith-Pettit Foundation sponsors an annual lecture in conjunction with Sunstone Magazine.

Publication

The magazine is published about four times per year, and in addition to the annual Salt Lake symposium, the foundation generally sponsors three to five smaller-scale, regional symposia each year.

In 2018, Sunstone announced that it would no longer produce magazine issues throughout the year, due to the high costs of print publishing.  Instead, subscribers would receive articles as podcasts and electronic documents, with a print digest of all new articles to be published annually.  Podcast episodes would be published throughout the year and each contain at least two articles, and would be distributed through Patreon subscriptions.

 Editors and publishers 

See also

 Dialogue: A Journal of Mormon Thought''
 Mormon History Association
 List of Latter Day Saint periodicals

Notes

Sources

Further reading

External links
 Official website
 Sunstone Podcast

1975 in Christianity
1975 establishments in Utah
Visual arts magazines published in the United States
Quarterly magazines published in the United States
Independent magazines
Latter Day Saint periodicals
Magazines established in 1975
Magazines published in Utah
Mass media in Salt Lake City